FC Dinamo-Chuy UVD is a Kyrgyzstani football club based in Chuy Region, Kyrgyzstan that played in the top division in Kyrgyzstan, the Kyrgyz Premier League.

History 
19??: Founded as FC Dinamo-Chuy UVD.

Achievements 
Kyrgyz Premier League:
7th place: 1995 (Promotion/relegation play Off: Northern Zone)

Kyrgyzstan Cup:
1/16 finals: 2001

Current squad

External links 
Profile at footballfacts.ru

Football clubs in Kyrgyzstan